Iljaševci (in older sources Iljašovci) is a village in the Municipality of Križevci in northeastern Slovenia. The area is part of the traditional region of Styria. The entire municipality is now included in the Mura Statistical Region.

A small Neo-Gothic chapel in the settlement was built in 1871 and renovated in 1879 and 1921.

References

External links
Iljaševci on Geopedia

Populated places in the Municipality of Križevci